At least three steamships have been called Yarrowdale. Each bore the name when owned by Robert MacKill & Co of Glasgow, who may have named them after the valley of Yarrow Water in southern Scotland. All three ships were later renamed.

 was built as Yarrowdale in 1892, renamed Nicolaos Castriotis in 1902, Hohenfelde in 1912, Long Beach in 1917, and scrapped in 1924.
Aoki Maru was built as Boukadra in 1910, renamed Yarrowdale in 1929, Sung-Shan in 1935, Amba Alagi in 1938 and Aoki Maru in 1941, and sunk in 1944.
 was built as Yarrowdale in 1912, captured in 1916, converted into the German commerce raider Leopard, and sunk in 1917.

References